This is a list of assassinations which took place on the continent of Asia.

For the purposes of this article, an assassination is defined as the deliberate, premeditated murder of a prominent figure, often for religious or political reasons.

Afghanistan

Armenia

Azerbaijan

Bangladesh

Bhutan

Cambodia

China

Georgia

India

Indonesia

Iran

Iraq

Israel

Japan

Jordan

Kazakhstan

Korea

Kuwait

Kyrgyzstan

Laos

Lebanon

Malaysia

Maldives

Mongolia

Myanmar (Burma)

Nepal

Pakistan

Palestine

Philippines

Qatar

Saudi Arabia

Sri Lanka

Syria

Thailand

Turkey

United Arab Emirates

Vietnam

Yemen

See also
 List of assassinations by the Assassins
 List of people who survived assassination attempts

References

Asia
Lists of victims of crimes
Murder in Asia
Asia-related lists